Valeria may refer to:

People
 Valeria (given name), a female given name
 The gens Valeria,  a family at Rome

 Valeria (ancient Roman women), a name used in ancient Rome for women of the gens Valeria
 Saint Valeria (disambiguation), several saints
 Valeriya (born 1968), Russian pop star
 Valeria (footballer, born 1968), Valeria Aparecida Bonifacio, Brazilian football midfielder
 Valéria (footballer, born 1998), Valéria Cantuário da Silva, Brazilian football forward

Places
 Valeria, a late Roman province in Suburbicaria
 Valeria, Iowa, United States
 Valeria, Spain (Roman City), an important Roman city and one of the three major cities (with Segobriga and Ercavica) in the modern province of Cuenca
 Valeria (fictional planet), a planet in the Lensman universe
 Valeria, the name of Fay D. Flourite's native world in Tsubasa: Reservoir Chronicle
 611 Valeria, a 57-km (35-mile) wide asteroid

Other uses
 Valeria (Conan the Barbarian), a prominent character in the tales of Conan
 Valeria (Takemitsu), a 1965 chamber music composition by Tōru Takemitsu
 Valeria (1966 TV series), a Mexican telenovela
 Valeria (2009 TV series), a Venezuelan-American telenovela
 Valeria (2020 TV series), a Spanish streaming television series
 Valeria (moth), a genus of moths
 Legio vigesima Valeria Victrix, a Roman legion, probably raised by Augustus some time after 31 BC

See also
 Valer (disambiguation)
 Valera (disambiguation)
 Valerie (disambiguation)
 Valérien (disambiguation)